Sîrcova is a commune in Rezina District, Moldova. It is composed of two villages, Piscărești and Sîrcova.

Notable people
 Nicolae Olaru

References

Communes of Rezina District